The Ascension is the eighth studio album by American musician Sufjan Stevens. It was released through Asthmatic Kitty on September 25, 2020. The record was influenced by a range of artists, particularly Ariana Grande and her 2018 song "Thank U, Next".

Music and lyrics
NPR's Lindsay Zoladz describes The Ascension as "an 80-minute meditation that revisits nearly every one of the grand themes he has explored during his two-decade career: Love, death, faith, desire, place, country, apocalypse, resurrection."

Release
The album's lead single, "America", was released on July 3, 2020. A second single, "Video Game", was released on August 13 along with a music video choreographed by Jalaiah Harmon. A third single, "Sugar", and its music video were released on September 15.

Critical reception 

The Ascension received positive reviews upon its release. At Metacritic, which assigns a normalized score out of 100 to ratings from publications, the album received an average score of 80 based on 25 reviews, indicating "generally favorable reviews". Music critic Tom Hull gave it an A-minus and said "singer-songwriter" may be "too self-limiting" a designation for Stevens, who "is a pop composer of grand sweep and delicate bearing, an heir to Brian Wilson working on if anything a broader canvas. His is not a style I'm fond of, but half of these songs click for me, and the others seem to be lurking in the depths, awaiting their moment." Pitchfork's Sam Sodomsky, however, was more tempered in his praise, noting: "But despite its allusions to pop music escapism, The Ascension is, by design, kind of a drag: a dark and emotionally distant mood piece whose lyrics rarely touch on the specifics necessary to anchor the music, and whose music is rarely exciting enough to elevate his words."

Year-end lists

Track listing

Personnel 
 Sufjan Stevens – vocals (all tracks), drums and percussion (all tracks), Tempest (1–13, 15), electric guitar (1, 5, 7, 8, 10, 11, 13, 15), Prophet '08 (all tracks), Prophet 6 (1–11, 13, 15), Prophet X (1, 4, 7–9, 13–15), piano (2, 5, 14, 15), recorders (11, 15); performance, recording, engineering, arrangement, mixing, production; all original art, layout, design, typography
 Casey Foubert – bass guitar (1, 3, 5, 7, 9, 10, 12, 13), vibraphone (1), electric guitar (2, 4, 6–8, 11), lead electric guitar (9, 10, 15); recording and engineering (own contributions)
 Bryce Dessner – electric guitar (1)
 Emil Nikolaisen – black magic (1, 8); engineering (own contributions)
 James McAlister – additional drums and percussion (3–6), vocal cut-up effects (4); recording and engineering (own contributions)
 TW Walsh – mastering

Charts

References

External links
 

2020 albums
Asthmatic Kitty albums
Sufjan Stevens albums